Daniel Clement Dennett III (born March 28, 1942) is an American philosopher, writer, and cognitive scientist whose research centers on the philosophy of mind, philosophy of science, and philosophy of biology, particularly as those fields relate to evolutionary biology and cognitive science.

, he is the co-director of the Center for Cognitive Studies and the Austin B. Fletcher Professor of Philosophy at Tufts University in Massachusetts. 
Dennett is a member of the editorial board for The Rutherford Journal and a co-founder of The Clergy Project.

A vocal atheist and secularist,  Dennett is referred to as one of the "Four Horsemen of New Atheism", along with Richard Dawkins, Sam Harris, and the late Christopher Hitchens.

Biography

Daniel Clement Dennett III was born on March 28, 1942, in Boston, Massachusetts, the son of Ruth Marjorie (née Leck; 1903–1971) and Daniel Clement Dennett Jr. (1910–1947). Dennett spent part of his childhood in Lebanon, where, during World War II, his father, who had a PhD in Islamic Studies from Harvard University, was a covert counter-intelligence agent with the Office of Strategic Services posing as a cultural attaché to the American Embassy in Beirut. His mother, an English major at Carleton College, went for a master's degree at the University of Minnesota before becoming an English teacher at the American Community School in Beirut. In 1947, his father was killed in a plane crash in Ethiopia. Shortly after, his mother took him back to Massachusetts. Dennett's sister is the investigative journalist Charlotte Dennett. Dennett says that he was first introduced to the notion of philosophy while attending summer camp at age 11, when a camp counselor said to him, "You know what you are, Daniel? You're a philosopher."

Dennett graduated from Phillips Exeter Academy in 1959, and spent one year at Wesleyan University before receiving his Bachelor of Arts in philosophy at Harvard University in 1963. There, he was a student of W. V. Quine. In 1965, he received his Doctor of Philosophy in philosophy at the University of Oxford, where he studied under Gilbert Ryle and was a member of Hertford College. His dissertation was entitled The Mind and the Brain: Introspective Description in the Light of Neurological Findings; Intentionality.

Dennett taught at the University of California, Irvine, from 1965 to 1971, before moving to Tufts University, where he settled in for many decades, aside from periods visiting at Harvard University and several other schools.

Dennett describes himself as "an autodidact—or, more properly, the beneficiary of hundreds of hours of informal tutorials on all the fields that interest me, from some of the world's leading scientists".

He is the recipient of a Fulbright Fellowship, two Guggenheim Fellowships, and a Fellowship at the Center for Advanced Study in the Behavioral Sciences. He is a Fellow of the Committee for Skeptical Inquiry and a Humanist Laureate of the International Academy of Humanism. He was named 2004 Humanist of the Year by the American Humanist Association. In 2006, Dennett received the Golden Plate Award of the American Academy of Achievement.

In February 2010, he was named to the Freedom From Religion Foundation's Honorary Board of distinguished achievers.

In 2012, he was awarded the Erasmus Prize, an annual award for a person who has made an exceptional contribution to European culture, society or social science, "for his ability to translate the cultural significance of science and technology to a broad audience."

In 2018, he was awarded an honorary degree by Radboud University, located in Nijmegen, Netherlands, for his contributions to and influence on cross-disciplinary science.

Philosophical views

Free will
While he is a confirmed compatibilist on free will, in "On Giving Libertarians What They Say They Want"—chapter 15 of his 1978 book Brainstorms—Dennett articulated the case for a two-stage model of decision making in contrast to libertarian views.

While other philosophers have developed two-stage models, including William James, Henri Poincaré, Arthur Compton, and Henry Margenau, Dennett defends this model for the following reasons:

Leading libertarian philosophers such as Robert Kane have rejected Dennett's model, specifically that random chance is directly involved in a decision, on the basis that they believe this eliminates the agent's motives and reasons, character and values, and feelings and desires. They claim that, if chance is the primary cause of decisions, then agents cannot be liable for resultant actions. Kane says:

Mind

Dennett has remarked in several places (such as "Self-portrait", in Brainchildren) that his overall philosophical project has remained largely the same since his time at Oxford. He is primarily concerned with providing a philosophy of mind that is grounded in empirical research. In his original dissertation, Content and Consciousness, he broke up the problem of explaining the mind into the need for a theory of content and for a theory of consciousness. His approach to this project has also stayed true to this distinction. Just as Content and Consciousness has a bipartite structure, he similarly divided Brainstorms into two sections. He would later collect several essays on content in The Intentional Stance and synthesize his views on consciousness into a unified theory in Consciousness Explained. These volumes respectively form the most extensive development of his views.

In chapter 5 of Consciousness Explained Dennett describes his multiple drafts model of consciousness. He states that, "all varieties of perception—indeed all varieties of thought or mental activity—are accomplished in the brain by parallel, multitrack processes of interpretation and elaboration of sensory inputs. Information entering the nervous system is under continuous 'editorial revision.'" (p. 111). Later he asserts, "These yield, over the course of time, something rather like a narrative stream or sequence, which can be thought of as subject to continual editing by many processes distributed around the brain, ..." (p. 135, emphasis in the original).

In this work, Dennett's interest in the ability of evolution to explain some of the content-producing features of consciousness is already apparent, and this has since become an integral part of his program. He states his view is materialist and scientific, and he presents an argument against qualia; he argues that the concept of qualia is so confused that it cannot be put to any use or understood in any non-contradictory way, and therefore does not constitute a valid refutation of physicalism.

This view is rejected by neuroscientists Gerald Edelman, Antonio Damasio, Vilayanur Ramachandran, Giulio Tononi, and Rodolfo Llinás, all of whom state that qualia exist and that the desire to eliminate them is based on an erroneous interpretation on the part of some philosophers regarding what constitutes science.

Dennett's strategy mirrors his teacher Ryle's approach of redefining first person phenomena in third person terms, and denying the coherence of the concepts which this approach struggles with.

Dennett self-identifies with a few terms:

In Consciousness Explained, he affirms "I am a sort of 'teleofunctionalist', of course, perhaps the original teleofunctionalist". He goes on to say, "I am ready to come out of the closet as some sort of verificationist" (pp. 460–61).

Evolutionary debate
Much of Dennett's work since the 1990s has been concerned with fleshing out his previous ideas by addressing the same topics from an evolutionary standpoint, from what distinguishes human minds from animal minds (Kinds of Minds), to how free will is compatible with a naturalist view of the world (Freedom Evolves).

Dennett sees evolution by natural selection as an algorithmic process (though he spells out that algorithms as simple as long division often incorporate a significant degree of randomness). This idea is in conflict with the evolutionary philosophy of paleontologist Stephen Jay Gould, who preferred to stress the "pluralism" of evolution (i.e., its dependence on many crucial factors, of which natural selection is only one).

Dennett's views on evolution are identified as being strongly adaptationist, in line with his theory of the intentional stance, and the evolutionary views of biologist Richard Dawkins. In Darwin's Dangerous Idea, Dennett showed himself even more willing than Dawkins to defend adaptationism in print, devoting an entire chapter to a criticism of the ideas of Gould. This stems from Gould's long-running public debate with E. O. Wilson and other evolutionary biologists over human sociobiology and its descendant evolutionary psychology, which Gould and Richard Lewontin opposed, but which Dennett advocated, together with Dawkins and Steven Pinker. Gould argued that Dennett overstated his claims and misrepresented Gould's, to reinforce what Gould describes as Dennett's "Darwinian fundamentalism".

Dennett's theories have had a significant influence on the work of evolutionary psychologist Geoffrey Miller.

Religion and morality
Dennett is a vocal atheist and secularist, a member of the Secular Coalition for America advisory board, and a member of the Committee for Skeptical Inquiry, as well as an outspoken supporter of the Brights movement. Dennett is referred to as one of the "Four Horsemen of New Atheism", along with Richard Dawkins, Sam Harris, and the late Christopher Hitchens.

In Darwin's Dangerous Idea, Dennett writes that evolution can account for the origin of morality. He rejects the idea that morality being natural to us implies that we should take a skeptical position regarding ethics, noting that what is fallacious in the naturalistic fallacy is not to support values per se, but rather to rush from facts to values.

In his 2006 book, Breaking the Spell: Religion as a Natural Phenomenon, Dennett attempts to account for religious belief naturalistically, explaining possible evolutionary reasons for the phenomenon of religious adherence.
In this book he declares himself to be "a bright", and defends the term.

He has been doing research into clerics who are secretly atheists and how they rationalize their works. He found what he called a "don't ask, don't tell" conspiracy because believers did not want to hear of loss of faith. That made unbelieving preachers feel isolated but they did not want to lose their jobs and sometimes their church-supplied lodgings and generally consoled themselves that they were doing good in their pastoral roles by providing comfort and required ritual. The research, with Linda LaScola, was further extended to include other denominations and non-Christian clerics. The research and stories Dennett and LaScola accumulated during this project were published in their 2013 co-authored book, Caught in the Pulpit: Leaving Belief Behind.

Memetics, postmodernism and deepity
Dennett wrote about and advocated the notion of memetics as a philosophically useful tool, most recently in his "Brains, Computers, and Minds", a three-part presentation through Harvard's MBB 2009 Distinguished Lecture Series.

Dennett has been critical of postmodernism, having said: 

Dennett adopted and somewhat redefined the term "deepity", originally coined by Miriam Weizenbaum. Dennett used "deepity" for a statement that is apparently profound, but is actually trivial on one level and meaningless on another. Generally, a deepity has two (or more) meanings: one that is true but trivial, and another that sounds profound and would be important if true, but is actually false or meaningless. Examples are "Que será será!", "Beauty is only skin deep!", "The power of intention can transform your life." The term has been cited many times.

Artificial intelligence 
While approving of the increase in efficiency that humans reap by using resources such as expert systems in medicine or GPS in navigation, Dennett sees a danger in machines performing an ever-increasing proportion of basic tasks in perception, memory, and algorithmic computation because people may tend to anthropomorphize such systems and attribute intellectual powers to them that they do not possess. He believes the relevant danger from artificial intelligence (AI) is that people will misunderstand the nature of basically "parasitic" AI systems, rather than employing them constructively to challenge and develop the human user's powers of comprehension.

As given in his most recent book, From Bacteria to Bach and Back, Dennett's views are contrary to those of Nick Bostrom. Although acknowledging that it is "possible in principle" to create AI with human-like comprehension and agency, Dennett maintains that the difficulties of any such "strong AI" project would be orders of magnitude greater than those raising concerns have realized. According to Dennett, the prospect of superintelligence (AI massively exceeding the cognitive performance of humans in all domains) is at least 50 years away, and of far less pressing significance than other problems the world faces.

Personal life
Dennett married Susan Bell in 1962. They live in North Andover, Massachusetts, and have a daughter, a son, and five grandchildren. He is an avid sailor.

Selected works

 Brainstorms: Philosophical Essays on Mind and Psychology (MIT Press 1981)
 Elbow Room: The Varieties of Free Will Worth Wanting (MIT Press 1984) – on free will and determinism
 Content and Consciousness (Routledge & Kegan Paul Books Ltd; 2nd ed.  1986)
 (First published 1987)
 
 Darwin's Dangerous Idea: Evolution and the Meanings of Life (Simon & Schuster; reprint edition 1996)
 Kinds of Minds: Towards an Understanding of Consciousness (Basic Books 1997)
 Brainchildren: Essays on Designing Minds (Representation and Mind) (MIT Press 1998) – A Collection of Essays 1984–1996
 
 Freedom Evolves (Viking Press 2003)
 Sweet Dreams: Philosophical Obstacles to a Science of Consciousness (MIT Press 2005)
 Breaking the Spell: Religion as a Natural Phenomenon (Penguin Group 2006).
 Neuroscience and Philosophy: Brain, Mind, and Language (Columbia University Press 2007), co-authored with Max Bennett, Peter Hacker, and John Searle
 Science and Religion: Are They Compatible? (Oxford University Press 2010), co-authored with Alvin Plantinga
 Intuition Pumps And Other Tools for Thinking (W. W. Norton & Company 2013)
 Caught in the Pulpit: Leaving Belief Behind (Pitchstone Publishing – 2013) co-authored with Linda LaScola
 Inside Jokes: Using Humor to Reverse-Engineer the Mind (MIT Press – 2011), co-authored with Matthew M. Hurley and Reginald B. Adams Jr.
 From Bacteria to Bach and Back: The Evolution of Minds (W. W. Norton & Company – 2017)

See also

 The Atheism Tapes
 Cartesian materialism
 Cognitive biology
 Mike Cooley (engineer)
 Evolutionary psychology of religion
 Jean Nicod Prize

References

Further reading

 John Brockman (1995). The Third Culture. New York: Simon & Schuster.  (Discusses Dennett and others).
 Andrew Brook and Don Ross (editors) (2000). Daniel Dennett. New York: Cambridge University Press. 
 Daniel C. Dennett (1997), "Chapter 3. True Believers: The Intentional Strategy and Why it Works", in John Haugeland, Mind Design II: Philosophy, Psychology, Artificial Intelligence. Massachusetts: Massachusetts Institute of Technology.  (reprint of 1981 publication).
 Matthew Elton (2003). Dennett: Reconciling Science and Our Self-Conception. Cambridge, UK Polity Press. 
 P.M.S. Hacker and M.R. Bennett (2003) Philosophical Foundations of Neuroscience. Oxford, and Malden, Mass: Blackwell  (Has an appendix devoted to a strong critique of Dennett's philosophy of mind)
 Don Ross, Andrew Brook and David Thompson (editors) (2000) Dennett's Philosophy: A Comprehensive Assessment Cambridge, Massachusetts: MIT Press. 
 John Symons (2000) On Dennett. Belmont, CA: Wadsworth Publishing Company.

External links

 Daniel Dennett at Tufts University
 
 
 
 
 Searchable bibliography of Dennett's works
  

1942 births
20th-century American philosophers
20th-century atheists
21st-century American philosophers
21st-century atheists
Alumni of Hertford College, Oxford
American atheism activists
American atheist writers
American humanists
American secularists
American skeptics
Analytic philosophers
Articles containing video clips
Atheism in the United States
Atheist philosophers
Charles Darwin biographers
American consciousness researchers and theorists
Critics of Christianity
American critics of Islam
Critics of Judaism
Critics of multiculturalism
Critics of postmodernism
Critics of religions
Critics of the Catholic Church
Cultural attachés
Fellows of the American Academy of Arts and Sciences
Fellows of the Association for the Advancement of Artificial Intelligence
Fellows of the Cognitive Science Society
Harvard College alumni
Jean Nicod Prize laureates
Living people
Members of the European Academy of Sciences and Arts
Memetics
New Atheism
Phillips Exeter Academy alumni
Philosophers of culture
Philosophers of education
Philosophers of mind
Philosophers of religion
Philosophers of science
Philosophers of technology
Presidents of the American Philosophical Association
Santa Fe Institute people
Science activists
Secular humanists
American social commentators
Social philosophers
Tufts University faculty
Wesleyan University alumni
Writers from Boston
Writers about activism and social change
Writers about religion and science
Fulbright alumni